Kanhan may refer to:

 Kanhan River in India
 Kanhan (Pipri), a town in India